Maria Consuelo "Connie" A. Dy is a Filipino politician who previously served as the representative of Pasay. She also served as councilor for one term before getting elected as representative. She is the second female representative of the city.

Background 
Maria Consuelo "Connie" Dy was born in Pasay.

Dy started her political career when she was elected as councilor in 1998. In 2001, she ran for representative and won. She was re-elected in 2004, defeating then-councilor Imelda Calixto-Rubiano.

In 2007, she ran for Mayor, but lost to Mayor Wenceslao Trinidad. She ran once again for mayor in 2010, but lost to then Vice Mayor Antonino Calixto. She never ran again in any elections since then.

References

People from Pasay
Members of the House of Representatives of the Philippines from Pasay
Year of birth missing (living people)
Living people
Metro Manila city and municipal councilors
Kabalikat ng Malayang Pilipino politicians